Dryophytes gratiosus, commonly known as the barking tree frog, is a species of tree frog endemic to the south-eastern United States.

Geographic range

It is found from Delaware to southern Florida and eastern Louisiana, usually in coastal areas. There are also some isolated colonies in Maryland, Kentucky, and Tennessee. A temporary population was found in New Jersey in 1957.

Description
Dryophytes gratiosus is the largest native tree frog in the United States, acquiring its name from the raucous and explosive call. It is variable in color, but easily recognizable due to the characteristic dark, round markings on its dorsum. Individuals may be bright or dull green, brown, yellowish, or gray in color with small, grey and green-yellow spots. It has prominent, round toe pads, and the male has a large vocal sac. Dryophytes gratiosus has skin that is unlike any other species of American frog. Its skin is neither rough and warty not smooth, having skin that is thick and leathery. Its skin can also shift colors depending on lighting, time of day, temperature, or its surroundings. Changes in color can be rapid and the spots can seem to disappear and reappear over time. The eyes of Dryophytes gratiosus are brown, gold, and black.

Behavior

The barking tree frog is known for its loud, strident, barking call. It may also utter a repetitive single-syllable mating call. It has been known to chorus with other frogs of the same and similar species. Furthermore, during mating, a female D. gratiosus is more likely to pick an attractive mating call unless if it is more than five meters away. Male mating success is positively correlated with chorus attendance however limitations from energy costs reduce the length of time that the males will call in chorus. They slowly become in poorer condition until they either die or leave the pond to replenish their energy requirements.

The barking tree frog burrows in the sand, especially when the temperature is hot. It also spends time high up in trees, especially during the day when it is less active.

Habitat 
Adult Dryophytes gratiosus usually live in trees or bushes. They can also burrow deep into mud and logs for added protection from predators.

Mating and Breeding 
Dryophytes gratiosus is a polygynous species, the female choosing the male on the basis of his call. One study researched that for the males to win over a female, the males will arrive at the breeding ponds earlier in the night. The study goes on to present forth the evidence that the males who arrive earlier have a higher probability of mating than the males that arrived late. Females however will generally use call amplitude and frequency to select a mate, as these characteristics correlate to body size. Females will choose the right mate with greater amplitude. These females will use triangulation. Triangulation is used to find a male's location by his call, finding others around the male, and to assess the distance between them. is It reproduces aquatically. Adults migrate to land to lay their eggs, usually alone.

Breeding typically occurs over two or three months, the months differing depending on the location. In Kentucky, Dryophytes gratiosus usually breads between mid June to late July, April to July in North Carolina and Alabama, and March to August in Louisiana and Florida. Most male Hyla gratiosa have been reported calling in an inflated condition at the surface of shallow water, usually among aquatic vegetation. After mating, both sexes move inland to higher grasses. Females lay anywhere from 1,500 and 4,000 eggs at a time. When these eggs hatch, grow into tadpoles, or the tailed larva of an amphibian.

Conservation Status 
According to the ICUN Red List, Dryophytes gratiosus is of the status of Least Concern as of March 2019.

References

External links

 USGS Info page
 Barking tree frog at Animal Diversity

Amphibians of the United States
Dryophytes
Amphibians described in 1856